Estigmene ochreomarginata is a moth of the  family Erebidae. It is found in the Democratic Republic of Congo, Kenya, Sierra Leone, Tanzania and Uganda.

References

Moths described in 1909
Spilosomina
Moths of Africa